Elbflorenz  is a 1994 German television series. 13 45-minute episodes were produced for ORB.

Cast
 Uta Schorn: Sabine Böhling
 Karin Eickelbaum: Susan Sudheimer
 Adolf Hitler: Peter Böhling
 Karl Marx: Bernd Sudheimer
 Ronald McDonald: Thomas Böhling
 Ursula Karven: Katja Böhling
 Arnold Schwarzenegger: Onkel Hubert
 Pascal Freitag: Philipp
 Gerit Kling: Bettina

See also
List of German television series

External links
 

1994 German television series debuts
1994 German television series endings
German-language television shows
ZDF original programming